The  is a Japanese electric multiple unit (EMU) train type operated by the private railway operator Seibu Railway. Twenty-five 10-car sets were manufactured by Tokyu Car Corporation and Hitachi between 1992 and 1998.

Featuring several advances in design, accessibility, and technology over older Seibu Railway sets, the 6000 series was designed for use on inter-running services to the TRTA (now Tokyo Metro) Yurakucho Line and also intended to serve as the basis for future Seibu train types. The train type first entered service on 1 June 1992 on the Seibu Ikebukuro Line and has since been introduced onto other lines, including the Seibu Yurakucho and Shinjuku lines, the Tokyo Metro Fukutoshin Line, and the Tokyu Toyoko Line.

Design 
The 6000 series was developed for use on inter-running services to the Yurakucho Subway Line, as well as to be the basis for future Seibu Railway vehicles. The trains incorporate bolsterless bogies to reduce weight and complexity. Furthermore, the 6000 series fleet features variable-frequency drive (VVVF) traction systems. The all-over "lemon yellow" livery used with several older Seibu train designs was discontinued in favour of bodyside blue and white accents.

Most of the fleet was constructed using unpainted stainless steel, with fibre-reinforced plastic used for the front ends; however, between 1996 and 1998, eight sets were constructed using aluminium bodywork throughout.

The interior is equipped with longitudinal seating throughout, with production sets being fitted with wheelchair spaces from new. All sets were initially built with LED passenger information displays above the doors.

Variants

Batches 1–4 

The first 6000 series batch consists of two 10-car sets6101 and 6102. These were the first trains to use stainless steel bodywork in Seibu's fleet. The sets were built by Tokyu Car Corporation in 1992 and designated as prototypes. The "SS125" and "SS025" bogies are the first new bogie designs to be used by Seibu Railway since the "FS372" and "FS072" bogies, which were first introduced with the 101 series trainsets in 1969. 

A batch of five production-ready 6000 series sets, numbered 6103 to 6107, first materialized in 1993, all of which were in service by 1994. For this batch, wheelchair spaces were installed in cars 2 and 9, and the openable side windows were replaced with fixed windows. Some portions of the driver's cab were modified to improve visibility. Since these sets were introduced, further design changes have been made, which are as follows.

 Batch 3 (sets 6108–6112): This batch of sets was introduced in preparation for the opening of the "up" portion of the Seibu Yurakucho Line extension to Nerima Station. The first four sets were built with subway-compatible radio equipment, with the last of those four (set 6111) also being equipped with automatic train control (ATC). As set 6112 was initially deployed on Shinjuku Line services, it was not built with such equipment.
 Batch 4 (sets 6113–6117): This batch of sets was introduced in 1995. There were minimal design changes over the previous batch.

Batches 5–7 

The fifth batch (sets 6151–6155) was manufactured from 1996. For this batch onward, aluminium was used for body construction. Additionally, Hitachi took over production of the 6000 series fleet; the manufacturer had previously supplied traction systems for earlier sets. These sets also feature a slightly altered bogie design over the ones used with the older sets.

Batches 6 (sets 6156 and 6157) and 7 (set 6158) were delivered between 1997 and September 1998, featuring slight design differences over the preceding batch. To reduce costs and weight, these sets do not feature door-pocket side windows or front-end passing lights, and the bogie design was changed to incorporate a monolink system; the new bogies used in these sets were given the classifications "SS-150" for powered bogies, and "SS-050" for unpowered bogies. All subsequent Seibu train types would incorporate monolink bogies, bar the 001 series Laview trainsets.

Formation 
, the fleet consists of 25 10-car sets (numbered 6101 to 6117 and 6151 to 6158), formed as follows.

Cars 2, 5, and 8 are each fitted with a lozenge-type pantograph. In 2018, sets 6101 and 6102 were equipped with single-arm pantographs.

History 
The 6000 series was introduced into service on the Seibu Ikebukuro Line on 1 June 1992, and on the Seibu Yurakucho Line in 1994 following the latter's expansion to Nerima Station. While the 6000 series was predominantly used on Ikebukuro Line services, some sets saw use on the Seibu Shinjuku Line network.

As more trains were required to cope with the increase in capacity brought on by the introduction of Ikebukuro Line and Yurakucho Subway Line inter-running services, which commenced on 26 March 1998, some 6000 series trainsets were cascaded to the Ikebukuro Line and fitted with the equipment necessary for such operation. During this transitional period, sets that were unable to operate on the Yurakucho Subway Line received yellow "S" markers on their front-end skirts to distinguish them from subway-interoperable sets and to prevent them from accidentally entering the subway line. Some sets were initially adorned with green markers, but the colour used was eventually standardized to yellow.

Introduction onto the Tokyo Metro Fukutoshin Line 

Ahead of the introduction of Tokyo Metro Fukutoshin Line inter-running services, twenty-three 6000 series sets were refurbished between 2006 and 2010. The work included the following:

 Replacement of roller-blind destination displays with full-colour LED destination displays
 Installation of external speakers
 White front ends (originally, they were silver)
 Remodeled driver's cab 
 Replacement of original two-handle control system replaced with single-handle control system that combines power and braking controls 
 Replacement of original instrument panel to accommodate new train monitoring system
 Installation of automatic train control (former Shinjuku Line-allocated sets only) and automatic train operation (ATO) 

During the refurbishment period, unrefurbished 6000 series sets were affixed with "Y" stickers to indicate that they lacked the upgrades necessary for Fukutoshin Line workings. Between 2008 and 2015, the original LED passenger information displays were replaced with 15-inch, double-screen LCD displays.

Inter-running services between the Ikebukuro Line and Fukutoshin Line commenced on 14 June 2008.

Tokyu Toyoko Line/Minatomirai Line interoperation 

On 16 March 2013, 6000 series trains were introduced on inter-running Tokyu Toyoko Line and Minatomirai Line inter-running services via the Fukutoshin Line.

Special liveries

From 18 April 2015, set 6157 was returned to service in a special all-over yellow livery to mark the 100th anniversary of the Seibu Ikebukuro Line. It carried this livery until April 2016.

References

Citations

Sources

External links

 Seibu Railway Train page

Electric multiple units of Japan
6000 series
Hitachi multiple units
Train-related introductions in 1992
1500 V DC multiple units of Japan
Tokyu Car multiple units